Enlarged to Show Detail 2 (full title: 311: Enlarged to Show Detail 2, a.k.a. E.T.S.D.2) is the second documentary created by the Multi-genred band 311 in 2001. This is their second video documenting their experiences as a band promoting what they consider to be peace and a positive outlook on life.  The video carries a Parental Advisory due to explicit lyrics and large display of adult content.

Enlarged to Show Detail 2 was certified as a Gold selling video by the RIAA.

 Format: Explicit Lyrics
 Rated: NR
 Studio: Bmg/Volcano/Capricorn
 DVD Release Date: December 11, 2001
 DVD Features:
 Number of discs: 2

Track listings

Disc 1 (DVD)
Intro 	2:25
3-11 Day 	6:00
The Hive 	1:56
Tim Mahoney 	2:03
311 in Japan 	3:23
Nick Hexum 	2:44
311 Milk Challenge 	4:05
Old School 	1:41
SA Martinez 	6:58
Tolerance 	7:24
Halloween 	1:38
Chad Sexton 	2:40
Weenie Roast 	3:21
P-Nut 	3:39
Small Venues 	7:28
The Fans 	1:50
Management & Crew 	7:39

Disc 2 (Bonus CD EP)

Dancehall
Bomb the Town
Will The World (Instrumental)
We Do It Like This
Dreamland (Instrumental)
I'll Be Here Awhile (Acoustic Version)

Track Listing info from MusicMoz

External links

 

Documentary films about rock music and musicians
311 video albums
2001 video albums
2001 live albums
2001 EPs
Live video albums
2000s English-language films